Dayville is a census-designated place (CDP) in the northwest part of the town of Killingly in Windham County, Connecticut, United States. Interstate 395 passes through the east side of the CDP, leading south to Norwich and north to Auburn, Massachusetts.

Dayville was first listed as a CDP prior to the 2020 census.

The Dayville Historic District occupies  at the center of the village.

References 

Census-designated places in Windham County, Connecticut
Census-designated places in Connecticut